Lepidophorus is a genus of broad-nosed weevils in the family Curculionidae. There are about 13 described species in Lepidophorus.

Species

References

Further reading

 
 
 
 
 
 
 
 
 
 

Entiminae